Deliverance is a 1919 silent film which tells the story of the life of Helen Keller and her teacher, Annie Sullivan. It stars Etna Ross, Tula Belle, Edith Lyle, Betty Schade, Sarah Lind, Ann Mason and Jenny Lind. The film also features appearances by Helen Keller, Anne Sullivan, Kate Adams Keller and Phillips Brooks Keller as themselves. The movie was directed by George Foster Platt and written by Francis Trevelyan Miller.

Cast (in credits order)
Etna Ross	... 	Young Helen Keller
Tula Belle	... 	Young Nadja
Edith Lyle	... 	Younger Anne Sullivan (as Edythe Lyle)
Betty Schade	... 	Mrs. Kate Adams Keller as a young woman
Jenny Lind	... 	Martha Washington
Sarah Lind	... 	Mammy
Ann Mason	... 	Helen Keller as a young woman
Helen Keller	... 	Herself
Anne Sullivan	... 	Herself
Kate Adams Keller	... 	Herself
Phillips Brooks Keller	... 	Himself
Polly Thompson	        ... 	Helen's secretary
Ardita Mellinina	... 	Nadja
J. Parks Jones  	... 	Nadja's son
True Boardman	... 	Helen's boy friend (uncredited)
Herbert Heyes      ...     Ulysses (uncredited)

Preservation status
A copy of the film is in the Library of Congress film archive.

References

External links

1919 films
American black-and-white films
American silent feature films
1910s biographical drama films
American biographical drama films
Helen Keller
Cultural depictions of Helen Keller
1919 drama films
Films directed by George Foster Platt
1910s American films
Silent American drama films